Anachis terpsichore is a species of sea snail in the family Columbellidae, the dove snails.

Description
The shell size varies between 10 mm and 20 mm.

Distribution
This species is found in the Red Sea and along India and Sri Lanka.

References

 Vine, P. (1986). Red Sea Invertebrates. Immel Publishing, London. 224 pp

External links
 

terpsichore
Gastropods described in 1822